Eucithara souverbiei is a small sea snail, a marine gastropod mollusk in the family Mangeliidae.

Description
The length of the shell attains 7 mm.

The shell is minutely tuberculate at the shoulder-angle, and covered by minute revolving striae. Its color is whitish, with a large dorsal brownish spot or stain. It is also characterized by small, wavy spiral striae that are little protruding.

Distribution
This marine species is endemic to Australia and occurs off Queensland; it was also found off the Loyalty Islands and the Cocos-Keeling Islands.

References

 Souverbie, M. (1875) Descriptions d’espèces nouvelles de l’Archipel Calédonien. Journal de Conchyliologie, 23, 282–296. page(s): 288, pl. 13 fig. 5 
 Cernohorsky, W.O. 1978. Tropical Pacific Marine Shells. Sydney : Pacific Publications 352 pp., 68 pls.

External links
  Tucker, J.K. 2004 Catalog of recent and fossil turrids (Mollusca: Gastropoda). Zootaxa 682:1-1295.
  Hedley, C. 1922. A revision of the Australian Turridae. Records of the Australian Museum 13(6): 213-359, pls 42-56
 Hervier, J. 1898. Descriptions d'espèces nouvelles de Mollusques provenant de l'Archipel de la Nouvelle-Calédonie. Journal de Conchyliologie 45: 165-195, 249-266, pls 7-8
  Maes Virginia Orr, The Littoral Marine Mollusks of Cocos-Keeling Islands (Indian Ocean); Proceedings of the Academy of Natural Sciences of Philadelphia, Vol. 119 (1967), pp. 93-217
 MNHN, Paris: syntype

souverbiei
Gastropods described in 1884
Gastropods of Australia